The Oster is a river in the northern Ukrainian oblast of Chernihiv. The river is a left tributary of the Desna River. It is approximately 199 km long and its basin area is 2,950 km2. It is connected by canals and streams with the Trubizh River, which flows southwest from Kyiv into the Dnieper River. Important towns and villages on the river include: Nizhyn, Kozelets, Roslavl and Oster.

References

Rivers of Chernihiv Oblast